El amor nunca muere may refer to:

 Love Never Dies (1955 film) (El amor nunca muere), a 1955 Argentine romantic drama film
 El amor nunca muere (telenovela), a Mexican telenovela